Kentwan Balmer (born October 15, 1986) is a former American football defensive end and current coach for the Hampton Pirates. He was drafted by the San Francisco 49ers in the first round of the 2008 NFL Draft with the 29th overall pick. He played college football at University of North Carolina.

He has also been a member of the Seattle Seahawks, Carolina Panthers, and Washington Redskins.

He is formerly was the Defensive Ends Coach at Alabama A&M University.

Coaching career
Virginia University of Lynchburg Head Coach Bobby Rome II name 1st Round draft Pick to the San Francisco 49ers Kentwan Balmer as his Assistant Head Coach and Defensive Coordinator.

College career
Balmer started all twelve games at right defensive tackle as a senior, ranking second on the team with 59 tackles (33 solos), including 3.5 sacks for minus 26 yards, 9.5 stops for losses of 44 yards and twenty four quarterback pressures. In 2005, he played 11 games with three starts and 17 tackles (5 for a loss) and 1 sack. As a freshman, he played in nine games and made one tackle.

Measurables

Professional career

San Francisco 49ers
Balmer was selected in the first round of the 2008 NFL Draft, 29th overall. He was originally drafted as a DT but was moved to DE due to the Niners 3-4 defensive scheme.

On December 9, 2009, Balmer was placed on injured reserve with a shoulder injury. The 49ers later signed Baraka Atkins to take over his position.

Seattle Seahawks
Balmer was traded to the Seattle Seahawks on August 16, 2010 in exchange for a sixth round pick in a future NFL Draft. He was waived on August 24, 2011.

Carolina Panthers
On August 25, Balmer was claimed off waivers by the Carolina Panthers. However, he was waived on September 1.

Washington Redskins
Balmer signed with the Washington Redskins on November 8, 2011.  On August 2, 2012, it was reported that he did not show up to training camp two days in a row and his agent has not replied to any inquiries as to Balmer's whereabouts. It was assumed that, Balmer left the team after Redskins officials checked his hotel room and saw that all of Balmer's personal effects were gone. Head coach Mike Shanahan announced that the team had finally made contact with Balmer on August 11, but did not explain the reason for his disappearance or his future with the Redskins.

Nearly two years after he walked away from the team, the Redskins officially terminated his contract on May 30, 2014.

NFL statistics

Personal life
Balmer went to Weldon High School in Weldon, North Carolina, where he played a variety of sports and which is where he decided to go back to and retired his jersey.

Balmer grew up rooting for the 49ers and his father, Charles Balmer, was a 49ers fan.

References

External links

North Carolina Tar Heels bio
2008 NFL Draft Scouting Report

1986 births
Living people
People from Ahoskie, North Carolina
Players of American football from North Carolina
American football defensive tackles
American football defensive ends
North Carolina Tar Heels football players
San Francisco 49ers players
Seattle Seahawks players
Carolina Panthers players
Washington Redskins players